The Raznic (also: Obedeanca) is a right tributary of the river Jiu in Romania. It discharges into the Jiu in Breasta.

References

Rivers of Romania
Rivers of Dolj County